This is a list of films about basketball, featuring notable films where basketball plays a central role in the development of the plot.

List

See also
 List of sports films
 List of highest-grossing sports films

References

Films

Basketball